Budding of a Rose is a studio album by American jazz trumpeter Wadada Leo Smith with a large ensemble. The album was recorded in Paris, following a radio performance the day before, and released in 1979 via German Moers Music label.

Background
Smith explains that "Budding of a Rose" refers to an idea about mysticism or enlightenment, for the rose is one of the symbols of the Rosicrucians. The song "Harmonium" talks about the balance of the Universe. In "Mutumishi" Smith explored how instruments of different pitches could play the same lines.

Track listing

Partial list of personnel
Band
Leo Smith – trumpet
Roscoe Mitchell – alto saxophone 
Wes Brown – bass
Pheeroan AkLaff – drums, percussion
Marilyn Crispell – piano 
Bobby Naughton – vibraphone 
Pinguin Moschner – tuba

Production
Jürgen Pankarz – artwork
Alex Dutilh – photography 
Burkhard Hennen – producer 
Jef Gilson – recording

References

Wadada Leo Smith albums
1979 albums